Arxama is a genus of moths of the family Crambidae.

Species
Arxama atralis Hampson, 1897
Arxama cretacealis Hampson, 1906
Arxama ochracealis Hampson, 1906
Arxama subcervinalis Walker, 1866

References

Spilomelinae
Crambidae genera
Taxa named by Francis Walker (entomologist)